Arianzus or Arianzos was a town of ancient Cappadocia, inhabited in Byzantine times. Arianzus is a titular see of the Ecumenical Patriarchate of Constantinople.
Gregory of Nazianzus was born in Arianzus.

Its site is located near the Sivrihisar settlement in Güzelyurt, Asiatic Turkey.

References

Populated places in ancient Cappadocia
Former populated places in Turkey
Populated places of the Byzantine Empire
History of Aksaray Province
Titular sees in Asia
People from Aksaray Province